Ahsan Ayaz (born 5 October 1998 in Peshawar) is a Pakistani professional squash player. As of April 2018, he was ranked number 87 in the world.

References

1998 births
Living people
Pakistani male squash players
21st-century Pakistani people